The 2018 SAFF Championship Final is a football match that took place on 12 September 2018 at the Bangabandhu National Stadium, Dhaka. It was announced that the matches during the tournament, including the final, would take place at the Bangabandhu nation stadium, Dhaka. The Maldives came out 2–1 winners against India to secure their second SAFF Championship.

Route to the final

Match

Details

See also
 2018 SAFF Championship

References

External links 

 SAFF Official website

2018 SAFF Championship
2018
India national football team matches
Maldives national football team matches
2018–19 in Indian football
2018 in Maldivian football
September 2018 sports events in Asia